Julie Vince (pen name, Julia Wild) is a British writer from Royton, England. She is the author of seven romance novels from 1997 to 2021. The latest, in 2021 is her first historical novel

Awards
She was honoured in 2003 with the Love Story of the Year Award by the Romantic Novelists' Association for her novel, Illusions .

Selected works
 Dark Canvas (1997) RNA New Writers Award winner
 Blue Silk Promise (1998)
 Moon Shadow (1998)
 Soul Whispers (2001)
 Secrets (2001)
 Illusions (2002) RNA Award winner
 ''The Secret Notebook (2021)

References

External links
Official website

Living people
Year of birth missing (living people)
English romantic fiction writers
Women romantic fiction writers
20th-century English novelists
21st-century English novelists
English women novelists
People from Royton
21st-century English women writers
20th-century English women writers